Khalifa El-Bakhti (1950 – 25 March 2009) was a Moroccan footballer. He competed in the men's tournament at the 1972 Summer Olympics.

References

External links
 
 

Date of birth missing
1950 births
2009 deaths
Moroccan footballers
Morocco international footballers
Olympic footballers of Morocco
Footballers at the 1972 Summer Olympics
AS FAR (football) players
Botola players
Place of birth missing
Association football defenders